Woodville is a community in Kawartha Lakes, Ontario, Canada.  It is located west of Lindsay. The population is 718 (2021).

History
Known in the late 19th century as Irish Corners, the name of the town was changed to Woodville after the completion of the post office under postmaster John Morrison. In 1871 the Toronto and Nipissing Railway was built through the flourishing settlement and in 1878 Woodville became a police village, and incorporated in 1884.

Woodville had a town hall, lock-up, grist-mill, two foundries, a cheese factory, planing mill and sash and door factory, a number of dry goods stores, mechanics' shops, and three hotels. It also had its own brick school house, with two teachers, and two churches – one Presbyterian, the other Methodist. Today, the cheese factory, rail station, gristmill, mechanics shops, and hotels have all been shut down.

Woodville now is home to two restaurants, one variety store, a post office, a curling rink and arena, two baseball diamonds and a newer school, first built in 1923.

Geography
A two and one-half kilometres (one and a half miles) to the east of Woodville is an auction barn which was opened in 1961 by Norman MacIntyre and his family.

The local post office on King St. serves locals with lock boxes.

Demographics 

Notable people
 Malcolm Bruce Jackson, politician
 Billy McGimsie, hockey hall of famer who played for the Stanley Cup-winning Kenora Thistles
 Adam Rogers, CFL player
 Tom Thornbury, NHL player
 James Barker, country musician

See also

 List of unincorporated communities in Ontario

References

Former villages in Ontario
Designated places in Ontario
Communities in Kawartha Lakes